Vagococcus is a genus of gram-positive bacteria. They are motile or nonmotile cocci which do not form spores. The name Vagococcus comes from Latin adjective vagus meaning wandering; and the Greek noun coccus a grain or berry, Vagococcus - wandering coccus, because Vagococcus fluvialis and some other Vagococcus species are motile, an unusual property for a lactic acid bacteria.

History 
The first Vagococcus species, Vagococcus fluvialis, was isolated from chicken feces in 1974. However, the genus was not recognized as distinct until 1989.

References

External links 
Vagococcus page on LPSN

Lactobacillales
Bacteria genera